Rindr or Rinda (Latin) (sometimes Anglicized Rind) is a female goddess in Norse mythology, alternatively described as a giantess or a human princess from the east. She was impregnated by Odin and gave birth to the avenger of Baldr's death—in the Old Norse sources, Váli.

Snorri Sturluson's Prose Edda refers to Rindr as the mother of Váli and one of the ásynjur (goddesses). The most detailed account is in Book III of the Gesta Danorum, written by Saxo Grammaticus around the early 13th century. There she is called Rinda and is the daughter of the King of the Ruthenians. After Balderus' death Odin consulted seers on how to get revenge. On their advice Odin went to the Ruthenians disguised as a warrior called Roster. There he was twice turned down by Rinda. He then wrote runes on a piece of bark and touched her with it, causing her to go mad, and disguised himself as a medicine woman called Wecha, who was allowed to see her. Finally she fell ill; the disguised Odin then said he had medicine with which to cure her but that it would cause a violent reaction. On Odin's advice, the king tied Rinda to her bed, and Odin proceeded to rape her. From the rape was born Váli, who would later avenge Balderus.

Óðinn’s rape of Rindr is described once outside the Gesta Danorum, in a line of stanza 3 of Sigurðardrápa, a poem by Kormákr Ögmundarson praising Sigurðr Hlaðajarl, who ruled around Trondheim in the mid-10th century. Like other such praise-poems, it is generally assumed to be genuine rather than a later pseudo-historical composition. Kormákr’s verse contains the statement, seið Yggr til Rindar (Yggr [Óðinn] ?enchanted Rindr), denoting Óðinn’s magical rape of Rindr with the verb síða. This suggests that Kormakr thought the magic known as seiðr was integral to Óðinn’s raping of Rindr, and is important evidence for Óðinn's association with this kind of magic. Another passage that may refer to the same event is in verse 6 of the Eddic poem "Grógaldr": þann gól Rindi Rani (that [charm] Rani chanted to Rindr).

Rindr's name occurs in several skaldic verses and in "Baldrs draumar", where alliteration suggests it may originally have been *Vrindr; the etymology remains uncertain but there may be a connection with the Swedish placename Vrinnevi or Vrinnevid, near Norrköping.

References

Gýgjar
Mythological rape victims
Mythological princesses